The Fairies were a British rhythm and blues band led by drummer John 'Twink' Alder, who recorded three singles between 1964 and 1965.

The group began in Colchester, Essex, in 1963 as 'Dane Stephens and the Deep Beats'. After a year, the band evolved into 'The Fairies' - Dane Stephens (born Douglas Robert Ord, vocals/blues harp), John 'Akky' Acutt (lead guitar, ex-the Strangers), Mick 'Wimps' Weaver (rhythm guitar/fiddle - not the same-named organ player also known as Wynder K Frog), John Frederick 'Freddy' Gandy (bass) and John 'Twink' Alder (drums, ex-the Strangers).

In late 1964 the Fairies recorded the single "Don't Think Twice It's Alright" for the Decca Records label. Around the same time, the band made newspaper headlines when members were arrested for climbing up a statue. Twink later recalled:"With Dane Stephens, our shows were not only blues but soul numbers, touches of jazz as well. He was an amazing singer, very very special. Had a great voice, played amazing blues harp, the Fairies were just about to break big." "Dane Stephens was involved in a fatal accident while he was driving the group van - without any license or insurance. He served time in jail, so we lost him for a year and got Nik Wymer from Nix Nomads instead. We had been actually about to break at that point, there was no doubt about it. We had Mickie Most producing us in the studio, we had a single out and another one on the way, an agent who was getting us booked back again everywhere - we were good, a really good R&B band."In 1965, after Wymer replaced Stephens as singer, they recorded two more singles, "Get Yourself Home" and "Don't Mind", for HMV. "Get Yourself Home" was written by Johnnie Dee, road manager for the Fairies, but rejected by the Pretty Things and recorded by the Fairies instead; previously, Dee's song "Don't Bring Me Down" had been rejected by the Fairies but became a hit for the Pretty Things in 1964. Twink: "We became like the Pretty Things when Nik Wymer came along - mostly because Nik looked and sounded so much like Phil May... and then after [Dane Stephens] came out Nik left and we got Dane back but we were really trying to recreate something which we'd already lost." Nik Wymer briefly joined an embryonic group formed by ex-members of Them in late 1965. Brian 'Smudger' Smith from Watford R&B band 'Cops 'n' Robbers' may have sung with the band at some point, as Dane Stephens reportedly swapped to become Cops 'n' Robbers singer around late 1965 and possibly sang on their final single "It's All Over Now, Baby Blue".

The Fairies split at some date before 1967, Twink having already departed and joined London band the In-Crowd in August 1966. This band evolved into Tomorrow, and from there Twink joined the Pretty Things and the Pink Fairies before launching a solo career. Dane Stephens recorded under the pseudonym 'Zion De Gallier' for Tomorrow producer Mark Wirtz. Freddie Gandy joined Bluesology alongside Long John Baldry, Elton Dean and Reggie Dwight (Elton John), followed by a late line-up of Sam Gopal in 1969 and Hookfoot in the early 1970s. Twink reunited with Stephens and Weaver on his 1991 album Odds & Beginnings, which included the tracks "Anytime At All", "Don’t Bring Me Down", "Get Yourself Home" and "Boot Black". The Ipswich-based Nik Wymer Band (NWB) released the album Time Will Tell in 2009.

Discography
Singles
"Don't Think Twice It's Alright" / "Anytime At All" - 7" single (Decca Records, 1964)
"Get Yourself Home" / "I'll Dance" - 7" single (HMV, 1965)
"Don't Mind" / "Baby Don't" - 7" single (HMV, 1965)

Zion De Gallier (Dane Stephens) Singles
"Me" / "Winter Will Be Cold" - 7" single (Parlophone, 1968) 
"Dream Dream Dream" / "Geraldine" - 7" single (Parlophone, 1968)

References

External links
Interview with Twink By Ivor Trueman, Opel #11, 5 December 1985
Twink - interview (Ptolemaic Terrascope #3 1990)

English rock music groups
Musical groups established in 1963
Musical groups disestablished in 1966
Musical groups from London